The Cortesi Brothers were four siblings of Italian descent who became notorious crime figures in London during the first decades of the 20th century with their primary lieutenant Alexander Tomaso otherwise known as Sandy Rice. The brothers were Augustus ‘Gus’ Cortesi, Enrico ‘Frenchie’ Cortesi, Paolo ‘Paul’ Cortesi and George Cortesi.

Early life 
Originating in Italy, the Cortesi family moved to Paris, France, where all four brothers were born.  Their mother, Angele Cortesi, brought the family to England between 1891 and 1901,  In 1901, the family is listed at Little Saffron Hill, Clerkenwell.

Gang years 
As the Cortesi brothers reached adulthood, they became involve in protection racketeering of gamblers and bookmakers. They were close to criminals in the Italian Sabini family.  However, the two families became rivals because the Cortesi brothers believed they were being denied a fair share of proceeds from West End of London gambling clubs and wrung from bookmakers.

In 1922, the rivalry culminated in a confrontation at the Fratellanza Social Club at 23 Great Bath Street, Clerkenwell. On 20 November 1922, Darby and Harry Sabini arrived at the club, probably to talk peace. Three women occupied one table and the only others present were the four Cortesi brothers and Sandy Rice.  Words were exchanged and tempers boiled over – Paul Cortesi threw a cup of hot coffee in the face of Harry Sabini and they started to fight. On this occasion it was the Cortesis who were armed with revolvers. Gus tried to shoot Darby Sabini, but his hand was knocked aside by one of the three women, Louisa Doralli, Darby's goddaughter. The shot went through a window. Darby Sabini was knocked down when Tomaso hit him with a bottle. Louisa then jumped in front of Harry Sabini as Enrico  Cortesi went to shoot him.  Harry pushed her away, allowing his brother to shoot Harry Sabini in the stomach.

When police officers later attempted to arrest the Cortesi brothers at their homes, a large mob thwarted them. However, the Cortese brothers later surrendered. Gus and Enrico (Frenchie) Cortesi were jailed for three years for attempted murder. George and Paul Cortesi and Tomaso were found not guilty of assault and discharged with the judge comparing the case to the feud between the Montagues and the Capulets.

Death 
Augustus Cortesi (1886–1949) is buried in St Mary's Catholic Cemetery, Kensal Green. Enrico ‘Frenchie’ (1884–1954) died in Hackney, London. Paolo ‘Paul’ (1891–1938) died in Islington. George (1888–1972) died in St Pancras, London.

References

Sibling quartets
Organised crime gangs of London
Former gangs in London
English people of Italian descent
Crime families